Behzat Çınar (born 9 April 1946) is a retired Turkish football striker and later manager.

References

1946 births
Living people
Turkish footballers
Altay S.K. footballers
MKE Ankaragücü footballers
Turkish football managers
Zeytinburnuspor managers
Denizlispor managers
Çanakkale Dardanelspor managers
Boluspor managers
Adana Demirspor managers
Association footballers not categorized by position